Andre Woolridge (born November 11, 1973) is an American former basketball player.  He was an All-American college player at the University of Iowa and played professionally for 12 years in nine different countries. In 2005, he was the Israeli Premier League Assists Leader.

Basketball career
Woolridge, a point guard from Omaha, Nebraska, starred for Omaha Benson High School where he led the team to the 1992 Nebraska state championship, scoring a record 50 points in the title game.  He chose to play college basketball at the University of Nebraska as part of an acclaimed recruiting class with fellow in state talents Erick Strickland and Jaron Boone.  He averaged 4.9 points and 2.0 assists per game and was named to the Big Eight Conference all-freshman team in 1993.

Following his freshman season, Woolridge transferred to Iowa to play for coach Tom Davis.  After sitting out the 1993–94 season due to NCAA transfer rules, he became a three-year starter for the Hawkeyes.  In his junior season, he was named first team All-Big Ten after averaging 13.1 points and 6.0 assists and leading the team to the 1996 NCAA tournament.  As a senior, Woolridge became the first player to lead the Big Ten in scoring and assists and was again named first team All-Conference.  Nevertheless, Bobby Jackson, who was later disgraced in the Ganglehoff scandal, received the Big 10 Player of the Year Award.  Woolridge also received national recognition as he was named a third team All-American by the Associated Press.

Following his college career, Woolridge was not selected in the 1997 NBA draft.  He instead signed with Beşiktaş in the Turkish Basketball League, starting an international career that included the top leagues in Turkey, Italy, France, Germany, and Israel. In 2005, he was the Israeli Premier League Assists Leader.  Woolridge retired in 2009 and started a basketball academy in Sacramento, California.

References

External links
Italian League profile
French League profile
TBLStat.net Profile
D-League stats

1973 births
Living people
All-American college men's basketball players
American expatriate basketball people in Cyprus
American expatriate basketball people in France
American expatriate basketball people in Germany
American expatriate basketball people in Greece
American expatriate basketball people in Israel
American expatriate basketball people in Italy
American expatriate basketball people in Turkey
American expatriate basketball people in Venezuela
American men's basketball players
Asheville Altitude players
Basketball Löwen Braunschweig players
Basketball players from Nebraska
BCM Gravelines players
Beşiktaş men's basketball players
Iowa Hawkeyes men's basketball players
Ironi Nahariya players
Keravnos B.C. players
Le Mans Sarthe Basket players
Nebraska Cornhuskers men's basketball players
Oyak Renault basketball players
Pallalcesto Amatori Udine players
P.A.O.K. BC players
Point guards
Sportspeople from Omaha, Nebraska
Trotamundos B.B.C. players